E. M. Sudarsana Natchiappan is a politician from Indian National Congress party and a Member of Parliament representing Tamil Nadu in the Rajya Sabha.

He was also elected to the Lok Sabha from Sivaganga constituency as an Indian National Congress candidate in 1999 election. He is Advocate in Supreme Court of India.

Sudarsana Natchiappan has addressed the United Nations General Assembly on two occasions, both in October 2008. He was part of the Indian delegation, and gave statements on UN peacekeeping operations and globalisation and independence.

Sudarsana Natchiappan is co-founder and President of the Parliamentarian Forum on Human Rights. The forum is a platform for members of parliament (MPs), cutting across party lines, and catering for the need to discuss and act on human rights violations in the world in general and in India specifically. He became the Union Minister of State for Commerce and Industry from 17 June 2013 till 26 May 2014 in Second Manmohan Singh ministry.

In Parliament 

Dr. Natchiappan has held the following during his tenure as a Member of Parliament for Tamil Nadu:
 Member, Committee on Science and Technology, Environment and Forests (1999–2000)
 Member, Committee on Government Assurances (2000–2004)
 Member, Consultative Committee for the Ministry of Information and Broadcasting (2000–2004)
 Member, Committee on Finance (2002–2004)
 Chairman, Committee on Personnel, Public Grievances, Law and Justice (Aug. 2004 – May 2009)
 Member, General Purposes Committee (Aug. 2005 – May 2009)
 Member, Consultative Committee for the Ministry of Information and Broadcasting (Oct. 2004 – 2008)
 Member, Committee on Rules (Nov. 2004 – Sept. 2010)
 Chairman, Parliamentary Forum on Human Rights, New Delhi (2004–Present)
 Member, Consultative Committee for the Ministry of Finance (2008 – May 2009) and (Aug. 2009 – June 2013)
 Member, Committee on Human Resource Development (Aug. 2009 – Aug. 2011)
 Member, Committee on Commerce (Aug. 2010 – Aug. 2012)
 Member, Committee on Labour (Aug. 2010 – Aug. 2011)
 Member, Select Committee to the Prevention of Torture Bill, 2010 (Aug. 2010 – Dec. 2010)
 Member, Committee on Papers Laid on the Table (Sept. 2010 – May 2013)
 President, Parliamentarian Forum on Human Rights for Global Development, New Delhi (Sept. 2010–Present)
 Nominated to the Panel of Vice-Chairmen, Rajya Sabha (Aug. 2011–Present) 
 Member, Joint Parliamentary Committee to examine matters relating to allocation and pricing of telecom licences and spectrum (Nov. 2011 – July 2013)
 Member, Business Advisory Committee (April 2012 – Aug. 2013)
 Member, Committee on Defence (Aug. 2012 – June 2013)
 Member, Committee on Ethics (Dec. 2012 – June 2013)
 Member, Committee on Public Accounts (May 2013 – June 2013)
 Chairman, Committee on Personnel, Public Grievances, Law and Justice (Sept. 2014–Present) 
 Member, Business Advisory Committee (Sept. 2014–Present)
 Member, Select Committee on the Payment and Settlement Systems (Amendment) Bill, 2014 (Dec. 2014 – Feb. 2015)
 Member, General Purposes Committee (Jan. 2015–Present)

References

External links
 Profile on Rajya Sabha website
 Parliamentarian Forum on Human Rights – For Global Development website
 Statement on UN peacekeeping in UN General Assembly
 Statement on globalization and independence in UN General Assembly

1947 births
Living people
Indian National Congress politicians
Rajya Sabha members from Tamil Nadu
India MPs 1999–2004
People from Sivaganga district